The 1987 Copa Libertadores was the 28th edition of the Copa Libertadores, CONMEBOL's annual international club tournament. Peñarol won the competition after beating América de Cali in the finals.

Group stage

Group 1

Group 2

Group 3

Group 4

Group 5

Semifinals

Group 1

Group 2

Finals

|}

Playoff

External links
 Sitio oficial de la CONMEBOL
 Libertadores 1987 at RSSSF.com

1
Copa Libertadores seasons